A Pol (pronounced as pole) is a housing cluster which comprises many families of a particular group, linked by caste, profession, or religion. This is a list of Pols in the old walled city of Ahmedabad in Gujarat, India. Heritage of these Pols  has helped Ahmedabad gain a place in UNESCO's Tentative Lists, in selection criteria II, III and IV. The secretary-general of EuroIndia Centre quoted that if  12000 homes of Ahmedabad are restored they could be very helpful in promoting heritage tourism and its allied businesses. The Art Reverie in Moto Sutharvado is Res Artis center.

The first pol in Ahmedabad was named Mahurat Pol.

List

The list of Pols in Ahmedabad is given below:

Aaka Sheth Kuva Ni Pol
Ambli Ni Pol
Amrutlal Ni Pol
Arjunlal Ni Khadki
Bangla Ni Pol
Bapa Shastri Ni Pol
Baua Ni Pol
Bhadva Pol 
Bhanderi Ni Pol
Bhau Ni Pol
Bhavanpura Ni Pol
Boabadiya Vaidh Ni Khadki
Bukhara Ni Pol
Chagan Daftar Ni Pol
Chhaghara No Pol
Chipa Mavji Ni Pol
Dabgarvad
Derdka Ni Pol
Desai Ni pol
Dev Ni Sheri
Devji Saraia Ni Pol
Devsa no pado
Deydi Ni Pol
Dhal Ni Pol
Dhanashuthar Ni Pol
Dhanpipla Ni Khadki
Dhinkva Pol
 Bado Pol
Dhobi Ni Pol
Doshiwada ni pol
Durgamata Ni Pol
Fafda Pol
Fatasa Pol
Gangadhiya Ni Pol
Gatrad Ni Pol
Ghanchi Ni Pol
Ghasiram Ni Pol
Gojaria Ni Pol
Golwad
Goti ni Sheri
Gusa Parekh ni Pol
Habib Ni Golvad
Haja Patel Ni Pol
Hajira Ni Pol
Halim Ni Khadki
Hanuman Ni Khadki
Hanuman Pol
Haran Ni Pol
Hari Bhakti Ni Pol
Harikarsandas Sheth Ni Pol
Hathikhana
Hathi No Choro
Haveli Ni Pol
Hinglok Joshi ni Pol
Hira Gandhi Ni Pol
Jadav Bhagat Ni Pole
Jalkukdi Ni Pol
Jani Ni Khadki
Jati Ni Pol
Javeriwad
Jethabhai Ni Pol
Jivan Pol
Kachariya Pol
Kadva Pol
Kaka Baliya Ni Pol
Kaljug Ni Khadki
Kalumiya No Takyo
Kalushi Ni Pol
Kameshwar ni Pol
Kansara Ni Pol
Kavishvar Ni Pol
Khatri Pol
Khichda Ni Pol
Khijada Ni Pol
Khijda Ni Pol
Khijda Sheri
Kikabhatt Ni Pol
Kokadia Ni Pol
khiskoli ni pol
Kokadiya Ni Pol
Kothari Ni Pol
Kuvavalo Khancho
Lakha Patel Ni Pol
Lakhiya Ni Pol
Lala Vasa Ni Pol
Lalabhai Ni Pol
Lamba Pada ni Pol
Lambeshwar ni Pol
Limbu  Pol
Limda Sheri
Mahajanwado
Mahalaxmi Ni Pol
Mahalaxmi No Khancho
Mahurat Pol
Makeriwad
Mali Ni Pol
Mamani Ni Pol
Mamunayak Ni Pol
Mandavi Ni Pol
Maniyasa Ni Khadki
Mankodi Ni Pol
Marchi Pol
Mehta Ni Pol
Modhwada Ni Pol
Morlidhan No Vero
Moti Rangila Pol
Moti Salepari
Motibhai Ni Khadki
Moto Sutharwado
Moti Vasansheri
Nani Vasansheri
Khatriwad
Bhavsar no Khanchho
Luhar Sheri
Kadiawad
Tadiyani Pol
Gandhini Pol
Mumanawad
Makeriwad
Navgharini Pol
Pipla Pol
Limda Pol
Nadavada Ni Pol
Nagar Bhagat Ni Pol
Nagarbodi Ni Pol
Nagarvado
Nagina Pol
Nagjibhudar Ni Pol
Nagorivad
Nagu Master No Delo
Naiwado
Nani Hama Ni Pol
Nani Rangila Pol
Nano Sutharwado
Nansha Jivan Ni Pol
Navdhani Ni Pol
Nisha Pol
Pada Pol
Padi Pol
Pagathiawalo Khancho
Pakhali Ni Pol
Panchbhai Ni Pol
Panditji Ni Pol
Panjara Pol
Parabdi Ni Pol
Parekh Ni Khadki
Patasa Ni Pol
Pipla Sheri
Pipardi Ni Pol
Puspkala ni pole
Rabarivas
Raja Mehta Ni Pol
Ranchhodji Ni Pol
Ratan Pol
Rugnath Bamb Ni Pol
Rupa Surchand ni Pol
Sadmata Ni Pol
Sai Baba Ni Pol
Salvi Ni Pol
Sambhavnath Ni Pol
Samet Shikhar Ni Pol
Sankdi Sheri
Sarkhedi Ni Khadki
Sarkivad Ni Pole
Sathwara No Khancho
Shamalji Thavar Ni Pol
Shamla Ni Pol
Shangar Sheri
Shantinath ni Pol
Sheth Ni Pol
Shevka Ni Wadi
Shriramji Ni Sheri
Sodagar Ni Pol
Soni Ni Khadki
Soni Ni Pol
Soni No Khancho
Surdas Sheth Ni Pol
Sutariya Ni Pol
Syamsangha Ni Pol
Taliya Ni Pol
Temla Ni Pol
Tokarsha Ni Pol
Tulsi Kyara Ni Khadki
Vada Pol Khadia
Vaghan Pol
Vagheshvarimata Ni pol
Vagheshvar ni pole
Verai Pada Ni Pol
Vinchi Ni Pol
Wadigaam
Zampada ni Pol
Zumkhi Ni Pol
Zupdi Ni Pol
Havada ni Pol
Hera Bhagat Ni Pol
Tankshal Pol
Bakra Pol Retiyawadi

References

External links
 Historic City of Ahmedabad

Ahmedabad district
Ahmedabad
Ahmedabad-related lists
Lists of tourist attractions in Gujarat
Tourist attractions in Ahmedabad